The flag of Croats of Serbia is one of the main symbols of the Croat minority in Serbia.

Design 

It consists of three equal size, horizontal stripes in colours red, white and blue. In the center of the flag is the coat of arms of Croats of Serbia. It is similar to the flag of the Republic of Croatia, but the difference is coat of arms in the center, rather than a crown on top, like the coat of arms of Croatia.

Adoption 

The flag and coat of arms of Croats of Serbia were adopted on 11 June 2005 in a session of the Croat National Council, in Subotica.

See also 

 Coat of arms of Croats of Serbia
 Croat National Council
 Croats of Serbia
 Croats of Vojvodina
 Flag of Croatia
 Coat of arms of Croatia
 Flag of Serbs of Croatia

References 

Croats of Serbia
Ethnic flags